Trochantha is a genus of flowering plants belonging to the family Celastraceae.

Its native range is Western Central Tropical Africa to Tanzania and Angola.

Species:
 Trochantha graciliflora (Welw. ex Oliv.) R.H.Archer 
 Trochantha preussii (Loes.) R.H.Archer

References

Celastraceae
Celastrales genera